The Serbian Hockey League Season for 2005-2006 was held. It started on October 14. In the end KHK Crvena Zvezda won, ending the dominance of HK Vojvodina.

Teams
 HK Vojvodina
 KHK Crvena Zvezda
 HK Novi Sad
 HK Partizan
 HK Subotica

Final standings

Playoffs

semifinals
 Vojvodina defeated Partizan
 Crvena Zvezda defeated Novi Sad

finals
 Crvena Zvezda defeated Vojvodina

third place
 Novi Sad defeated Partizan

Schedule and results
 14.10.04 Beograd HK Crvena Zvezda Beograd vs HK Novi Sad 10:0
 22.10.04 Beograd HK Crvena Zvezda Beograd vs HK Vojvodina Novi Sad 5:7
 25.10.04 Beograd HK Partizan Beograd vs HK Crvena Zvezda Beograd 3:6
 28.10.04 Beograd HK Partizan Beograd vs HK Novi Sad 2:6
 02.11.04 Beograd HK Partizan Beograd vs HK Vojvodina Novi Sad 4:14
 02.11.04 Novi Sad HK Vojvodina Novi Sad vs HK Novi Sad 6:3
 19.11.04 Beograd HK Partizan Beograd vs HK Vojvodina Novi Sad 3:7
 19.11.04 Novi Sad HK Novi Sad vs HK Crvena Zvezda Beograd 3:1
 23.11.04 Beograd HK Crvena Zvezda Beograd vs HK Vojvodina Novi Sad 2:0
 23.11.04 Subotica HK Spartak Subotica vs HK Partizan Beograd 3:8
 25.11.04 Beograd HK Crvena Zvezda Beograd vs HK Partizan Beograd 7:4
 26.11.04 Subotica HK Spartak Subotica vs HK Novi Sad 1:8
 03.12.04 Subotica HK Spartak Subotica vs HK Vojvodina Novi Sad 1:8
 03.12.04 Novi Sad HK Novi Sad vs HK Partizan Beograd 8:4
 07.12.04 Subotica HK Spartak Subotica HK Crvena Zvezda Beograd 1:16
 07.12.04 Novi Sad HK Vojvodina Novi Sad vs HK Novi Sad 6:5
 10.12.04 Beograd HK Crvena Zvezda Beograd vs HK Vojvodina Novi Sad 4:4
 14.12.04 Beograd HK Crvena Zvezda Beograd vs HK Vojvodina Novi Sad 3:2
 14.12.04 Beograd HK Partizan Beograd vs HK Spartak Subotica 10:1
 16.12.04 Beograd HK Crvena Zvezda Beograd vs HK Partizan Beograd 13:5
 17.12.04 Novi Sad HK Novi Sad vs HK Spartak Subotica 8:1
 09.01.05 Subotica HK Spartak Subotica vs HK Crvena Zvezda Beograd 1:23
 14.01.05 Beograd HK Partizan Beograd vs HK Novi Sad 5:7
 18.01.05 Novi Sad HK Vojvodina Novi Sad vs HK Novi Sad 8:2
 21.01.05 Novi Sad HK Novi Sad vs HK Crvena Zvezda Beograd 0:2
 21.01.05 Beograd HK Partizan Beograd vs HK Vojvodina Novi Sad missing
 25.01.05 Subotica HK Vojvodina Novi Sad vs HK Spartak Subotica 19:1
 28.01.05 Novi Sad HK Vojvodina Novi Sad vs HK Crvena Zvezda Beograd 5:0
 01.02.05 Beograd HK Crvena Zvezda Beograd vs HK Partizan Beograd missing
 01.02.05 Subotica HK Spartak Subotica vs HK Novi Sad 3:19
 04.02.05 Subotica HK Spartak Subotica vs HK Vojvodina Novi Sad 4:13
 04.02.05 Novi Sad HK Novi Sad vs HK Partizan Beograd missing

Serbian Hockey League
Serbian Hockey League seasons
Serb